Pho Thauk Kyar (born Maung Thauk Kyar on 5 February 1982) is a Burmese singer and actor.

Early life and career
Pho Thauk kyar, the second son of four siblings was born on 5 February 1982 to parents Thu Maung, film actor and his wife Aye Aye May. He began his career with film, "Sein Che Phya Yaung Lin" (စိန်ခြယ်ဖျာရောင်လင်း) alongside his father.

Filmography
Sein Che Phya Yaung Lin

Discography
Naga Ni (2018)

Personal life
He is married to Hlaing Yadanar Hsu on 16 March 2014.

References

External links
 

Living people
1982 births

Burmese male film actors
21st-century Burmese male singers
21st-century Burmese male actors
People from Yangon